Edward Eveleth Powars was a printer in Boston and Worcester, Massachusetts, in the late 18th century. He published the Independent Chronicle (1776-ca.1779), the Boston Evening-Post (1781–1784), the American Herald (1784–1790), and The Argus. He worked with Nathaniel Willis as "Powars & Willis."

In 1781 he kept his "printing-office" in Boston, at "the lower end of State-Street, over Mr. Simon Eliot's snuff-store." He moved to Worcester in 1788, "having been humiliatingly neglected ... for printing a free paper." By 1791 he'd returned to Boston; around 1796 he lived on Temple Street.

Around 1803 he worked "as a compositor in the office of Samuel Etheridge, in Charlestown." In 1813 "he held the office of Messenger to the Governor and Council of the Commonwealth."

"At a later period, he was a traveling bookseller, and died on one of his expeditions in the Western States."

References

External links

 WorldCat. Powars, Edward Eveleth

Businesspeople from Boston
19th century in Boston
18th century in Boston
American publishers (people)
American printers
Year of death unknown
Year of birth unknown